Gram Natural History Museum opened in 1976 in Gram in the Southern Jutland area of Denmark. It was located in Gram Palace until it was moved to a site next to the Gram Clay Pit in 2005. Once an independent museum, it became a part of the larger constellation of museums in Southern Jutland known as Museum Sønderjylland.

Exhibits 

The small museum focuses primarily on fossils found in the Gram Clay Pit, most of which are from animals such as the prehistoric shark Carcharodon megalodon who died in the Gram Sea (the shallow sea that covered most of Denmark) 10 million years ago in the early Miocene epoch.

The exhibit focuses in particular on whales and the evolution from land mammals to giants of the sea, as the remains of prehistoric whales have been found in the region. Of particular note is the discovery of a new species, Dagonodum mojnum, known as the Mojn-whale, named after the word for "goodbye" in the local dialect. There are six other prehistoric whales known from the period. In addition, a discovery of a new whale specimen in 2007 is thought to be a new species, but evidence is still lacking.

Gram Clay Pit 
Visitors to the museum can explore the Gram Clay Pit and search for fossils themselves. They are welcome to take the more ordinary fossils they find home with them.

References

External links 

 Gram Natural History Museum's Official Website

Museums in the Region of Southern Denmark
Haderslev Municipality
Natural history museums in Denmark
Museum Sønderjylland